Eleanor Cullis-Hill (4 November 1913 – 8 September 2001) was an Australian architect. Running a solo practice from her home between 1946 and 1981, she designed dozens of buildings and renovations, mostly residential, on Sydney's North Shore.

Early life and education
Cullis-Hill was born Eleanor Beresford Grant in 1913 in Warrawee, New South Wales, a suburb of Sydney. Her father was Joseph Beresford Grant, a businessman in real estate. She attended Frensham School in Mittagong and went on to study architecture at the University of Sydney. She graduated in 1938.

Career
Cullis-Hill began working as a professional architect after the Second World War. In a contract position with the New South Wales Housing Commission, she designed houses as part of Sydney's postwar reconstruction boom. She set up a solo practice in 1946 at her own home in Warrawee, since she felt that women architects were unwelcome in large firms. Initially, she accepted commissions from friends, and through word-of-mouth recommendations she received enough projects to keep her in full-time work.

Cullis-Hill worked mainly on Sydney's North Shore in the suburbs of Warrawee and Wahroonga, but she also designed residential renovations and houses in East Killara, Hunters Hill, Kenthurst, Pymble and Turramurra. In total, she designed more than 30 houses and around 50 residential alterations. She also designed church and school buildings: these included additions to Gib Gate School in Mittagong (1954–1973) and St James' Anglican Church in Turramurra (1957–1975) as well as the original plans for Wahroonga Nursery School (1954–1955) and the Turramurra Nursery School (1961). Her design for the Wahroonga Nursery School was shortlisted for the Australian Institute of Architects' Sulman Award in 1956.

Cullis-Hill retired in 1981 and died in 2001.

Family
In 1938 she married Grandison Cullis-Hill, a fellow architecture student at the University of Sydney. They had four children—Caroline, Josephine, Mary and David—and lived in a house on Bangalla Street in Warrawee that she designed. Her two eldest daughters, Caroline Martin and Josephine Roberts, also became architects.

References

1913 births
2001 deaths
20th-century Australian architects
Australian women architects
New South Wales architects
People from the North Shore, Sydney
University of Sydney alumni
People educated at Frensham School
20th-century Australian women
21st-century Australian women
21st-century Australian people